Vaiava Strait (Samoan: Vāinuu o Vaiava) is the name of a narrow strait located in Vatia, American Samoa. It is a  National Natural Landmark. The strait is a great example of cliffs formed by waves (via erosion) on volcanic rock. The strait consists of communal lands. It was designated as a U.S. National Natural Landmark in 1972. Pola-Uta is connected to the village of Vatia on Tutuila Island. Pola Tai is a  cliff that is an important nesting area for the fua'ō (brown booby) and tava'e (White tailored tropic bird). Hunting of brown boobies, known as the A'ega o le Pola, was a tradition carried out by Vatians in the past. Pola Tai includes Matalia Point, Cockscomb Point and Polauta Ridge. 

It is located on the north coast of Tutuila Island, on the northwestern side of the village of Vatia. It is a designated  National Natural Landmark, but also a part of the National Park of American Samoa. Erosion by the sea has sculpted deep cliffs and sea arches in the rocks of a huge volcanic plug (Pola Island). The  cliffs and rock top are important nesting and resting areas for several seabird species.

Gallery

See also
List of National Natural Landmarks in American Samoa

References

External links
 Vai'ava Strait National Park Service

National Natural Landmarks in American Samoa